The Sparkassen Cup is a defunct WTA Tour affiliated tennis tournament played from 1990 to 2003. It was held in Leipzig in Germany and played on indoor carpet courts.

The inaugural event was held from 24 to 30 September 1990, shortly before the German reunification.

Steffi Graf won the first four titles and won the tournament again in 1998 to make her the most successful player at the event. Anke Huber, Jana Novotná and Kim Clijsters also won multiple singles titles at the event.

Past finals

Singles

Doubles

References
 WTA Results Archive

 
Carpet court tennis tournaments
Indoor tennis tournaments
Defunct tennis tournaments in Germany
WTA Tour
Sports competitions in Leipzig
Recurring sporting events established in 1990
Recurring events disestablished in 2003
1990 establishments in East Germany